Wind from the East is a 1970 film by the Dziga Vertov Group, a radical filmmaking cooperative that, at its core, included Jean-Luc Godard and Jean-Pierre Gorin. As with most films from this period in Godard's career, directing credit was given to the collective and not himself or other individual filmmakers.

Of the Dziga Vertov Group films, Wind from the East became particularly notable due to Peter Wollen's influential essay about it: "Godard and Counter Cinema: Vent d'est." Wollen contends that Wind from the East exemplifies how Brechtian principles of "epic theatre" can be applied to film as "counter cinema."

Synopsis
The film reflects Gorin and (especially) Godard's interest in divorcing sound from image, as a means of reinventing the language of "bourgeois" commercial cinema.

The soundtrack of the film begins with the story of a kidnapped ALCOA executive but abruptly changes the subject to a lengthy lecture on the history and political context of revolutionary cinema, including Marxist–Leninist self-critique, and a critique of Hollywood's film industry. The visual component of the film features an outdoor natural setting and characters in what appears to be a spaghetti Western film (or a parody thereof). The two components, while separate, frequently interact; the soundtrack occasionally refers to the cinematic tropes that appear onscreen, while the story told in the visuals contains dialogue and sound that overlaps and competes with the primary soundtrack.

Cast
 Gian Maria Volonté - Le ranger nordiste
 Anne Wiazemsky - La révolutionnaire
 Allan Midgette - L'Indien
 Christiana Tullio Altan - La jeune bourgeoise
 José Varela - La guide
 Götz George - Soldier

Reception
John Simon described Wind from the East as 'a piece of infantile Maoist propaganda, so boring, antifilmic, sloppily made, and yes, insane, I see no point in a detailed description of it'.

References

Further reading
Julia Lesage, "Godard-Gorin's Wind from the East: Looking at a film politically," Jump Cut, no. 4, 1974, pp. 18–23. https://www.ejumpcut.org/archive/onlinessays/JC04folder/WindfromEast.html .

External links
 

1970 films
1970s French-language films
Films directed by Jean-Luc Godard
French avant-garde and experimental films
Non-narrative films
1970s avant-garde and experimental films
1970s French films